Belshaw is an unincorporated community in West Creek Township, Lake County, Indiana.

Belshaw was named for the Belshaw family of pioneer settlers.

Geography

References

Unincorporated communities in Lake County, Indiana
Unincorporated communities in Indiana